Wilhelm Gass (November 28, 1813 – February 21, 1889) was a German theologian born in Breslau. He was the son of theologian Joachim Christian Gass (1766–1831).

He received his education in Breslau, Halle and Berlin, and as a student was influenced by the teachings of August Neander (1789–1850). In 1846 he became an associate professor at the University of Breslau, and during the following year relocated to Greifswald, where in 1855 he achieved the title of professor ordinarius. In 1862 he was appointed professor of systematic theology at the University of Giessen, and in 1868 moved to Heidelberg as a successor to Richard Rothe (1799–1867). He died in 1889 in Heidelberg

His theological work largely dealt with the history of Protestant dogmatics, studies of the Greek Orthodox Church during the Middle Ages and the history of Christian ethics. Among his more important written works was the four-volume Geschichte der Lutherischen Dogmatik (History of Lutheran Dogmatics 1854-67), and an 1846 book on Georgius Calixtus and syncretism called Georg Calixt und der Synkretismus. Other noted works by Wilhelm Gass include:
 Beiträge zur kirchlichen Litteratur und Dogmengeschichte des griechischen Mittelalters (1844–49, 2 volumes)
 Zur Geschichte der Athosklöster (1865)
 Die Lehre vom Gewissen (1869)
 Symbolik der griechischen Kirche (1872)
 Optimismus und Pessimismus. Der Gang der christlichen Welt- und Lebensansicht (1876)
 Geschichte der Ethik (1881, volume 1)

References 
  English translation
 Wilhelm Gass translated biography @ Meyers Konversations-Lexikon

External links
 

German Lutheran theologians
Writers from Wrocław
Academic staff of the University of Giessen
Academic staff of Heidelberg University
Academic staff of the University of Greifswald
1813 births
1889 deaths
People from the Province of Silesia
19th-century German Protestant theologians
19th-century German male writers
German male non-fiction writers
19th-century Lutherans